James Richard Petersen (born February 22, 1962) is an American former professional basketball player, and a current television analyst with the Minnesota Timberwolves. From 2009 to 2017 he served as an assistant coach and later associate head coach for the Minnesota Lynx of the WNBA. He played as either a power forward or a center.

Basketball career

High school / college 
Petersen, a St. Louis Park native, played high school basketball at St. Louis Park High School, being named Minnesota's Mr. Basketball in 1980, as well as being the first McDonald's All-American from the state of Minnesota.

Born in Minneapolis, Minnesota, he then went on to be a four-year letter winner at the University of Minnesota, and a member of the 1982 Big Ten Championship team that featured future NBA veterans Trent Tucker and Randy Breuer.

NBA 
Petersen was selected by the Houston Rockets in the third round (51st overall) of the 1984 NBA Draft, alongside Hakeem Olajuwon. In the following four seasons, he played with the Texas club, backing up both Olajuwon and Ralph Sampson, who were known as the Twin Towers. Petersen played in 20 post-season games (averaging six points and six rebounds) as the team reached the NBA Finals, losing 2–4 to the Boston Celtics.

In 1988, Peterson was traded with Rodney McCray to the Sacramento Kings for Otis Thorpe. A year later, he was traded to the Golden State Warriors for former teammate Ralph Sampson.

In the 1986–87 season, as Sampson began to struggle with injuries, Petersen achieved career-best averages of 11 points and seven rebounds, playing in all 82 games and starting in 56. He retired in 1992 at the age of 30, after four seasons with the Rockets, one season with the Kings, and three seasons with the Warriors, with totals of 491 games and 3,397 points.

Post-retirement 

After leaving the NBA, Petersen worked for the National Basketball Players Association in their player programs division, facilitating seminars in NBA locker rooms in topics such as HIV and AIDS, financial planning, substance abuse and career planning for life after basketball. He also coached junior high, high school and AAU basketball teams in La Jolla, California and Minneapolis.

He has worked as a television analyst with the Minnesota Timberwolves since 2003; prior to that he was a radio analyst since 1998. As a broadcaster, Petersen has been acclaimed for his deep knowledge of basketball and detailed commentary on the nuances of the game.  In November 2008, Petersen was named assistant coach of the WNBA's Minnesota Lynx; in 2016 he was named Associate Head Coach. In January 2017, he announced he was stepping down as Associate Head Coach.

He resides in Wayzata, Minnesota with his wife Tika. His stepson Sanjay Lumpkin, is a professional basketball player who played for Northwestern University.

References

External links
Stats at BasketballReference

1962 births
Living people
American men's basketball players
American women's basketball coaches
Basketball coaches from Minnesota
Basketball players from Minneapolis
Centers (basketball)
Golden State Warriors players
Houston Rockets draft picks
Houston Rockets players
McDonald's High School All-Americans
Minnesota Golden Gophers men's basketball players
Minnesota Lynx coaches
Minnesota Timberwolves announcers
Parade High School All-Americans (boys' basketball)
People from St. Louis Park, Minnesota
Power forwards (basketball)
Sacramento Kings players
Sports coaches from Minneapolis